The following NFL All-Time Anniversary Teams have been selected during the National Football League's history:

 National Football League 50th Anniversary All-Time Team, selected in 1969
 National Football League 75th Anniversary All-Time Team, selected in 1994
 National Football League 100th Anniversary All-Time Team, selected in 2019